The women's 1500 metres at the 1971 European Athletics Championships was held in Helsinki, Finland, at Helsinki Olympic Stadium on 13 and 15 August 1971.

Medalists

Results

Final
15 August

Heats
13 August

Heat 1

Heat 2

Heat 3

Participation
According to an unofficial count, 30 athletes from 16 countries participated in the event.

 (1)
 (1)
 (3)
 (1)
 (1)
 (3)
 (2)
 (3)
 (1)
 (1)
 (2)
 (1)
 (2)
 (3)
 (3)
 (2)

References

1500 metres
1500 metres at the European Athletics Championships
1971 in women's athletics